Fascista quinella is a moth of the family Gelechiidae. It is found in North America, where it has been recorded from Florida, Georgia and Texas.

References

Moths described in 1873
Gelechiini